During the 1993–94 English football season, Luton Town F.C. competed in the Football League First Division.

Season summary
The 1993–94 season started with David Pleat making Dixon's move permanent, and re-signing Mitchell Thomas from West Ham United. Although Luton struggled in the league, form was found in the FA Cup – Scott Oakes starred as Luton raced to the FA Cup semi-final and a trip to Wembley. 27,500 Luton supporters saw Gavin Peacock seal a 2–0 win for Chelsea, and after the semi-final defeat, Luton lost five games in a row. However, a 3–2 home win over West Bromwich Albion earned survival three games from the end of the season, keeping Luton in the second tier for another year.

Final league table

Results
Luton Town's score comes first

Legend

Football League First Division

FA Cup

League Cup

Anglo-Italian Cup

Squad

References

Luton Town F.C. seasons
Luton Town